Conrad Robert Whitby (born 8 May 1984) is a Zimbabwean footballer who plays as a midfielder for Wivenhoe Town of the Eastern Counties Football League Premier Division.

Club career
Whitby started his career with English club Margate, having trialed with them in summer 2003 before signing for the club in January 2004. He went on to make three appearances for Margate, two in the Kent Senior Cup and one in the Conference South in the 3–3 draw with Dagenham & Redbridge on 6 March 2004. Whitby subsequently moved on to Ramsgate, where he made one appearance in the Kent Football League.

He went on to play for Mangotsfield United, Bitton and Keynsham Town. Whilst with Mangotsfield, Whitby served a 35-day suspension.

Whitby returned to Zimbabwe and played for Motor Action, Eagles, Kiglon and CAPS United before joining Botswanan club Township Rollers in 2012.

In 2014, he signed for Eastern Counties Football League Premier Division club Wivenhoe Town.

International career
Whitby was called up to the Zimbabwe national football team as a last-minute replacement alongside Pardon Chinungwa, Cliff Sekete, Tendai Samanja, Masimba Mambare and Graham Ncube for a friendly against Botswana in January 2012. The games finished a 0–0 draw, with Whitby coming on as a substitute.

Personal life
Whitby spent time in Thanet, Kent as a child and has a British passport.

References

External links

1984 births
Living people
Zimbabwean footballers
Zimbabwe international footballers
Expatriate footballers in England
Expatriate footballers in Botswana
Zimbabwean expatriates in Botswana
Expatriate soccer players in South Africa
Zimbabwean expatriates in South Africa
Association football midfielders
National League (English football) players
Southern Football League players
Margate F.C. players
Ramsgate F.C. players
Almondsbury F.C. players
Mangotsfield United F.C. players
Keynsham Town F.C. players
Motor Action F.C. players
Eagles F.C. (Zimbabwe) players
Kiglon F.C. players
CAPS United players
Township Rollers F.C. players
Polokwane City F.C. players
F.C. Cape Town players
Wivenhoe Town F.C. players